Juan Marcelo Robledo Pizarro (born 12 March 1978 in Santa Fe, Argentina) is an Argentine-born Bolivian football manager and former player who played as a goalkeeper. He is the current manager of Ecuadorian club Macará.

References

External links 
 
 

1978 births
Living people
Argentine footballers
Bolivian footballers
Association football goalkeepers
The Strongest players
Club Bolívar players
Guabirá players
C.D. Jorge Wilstermann players
Universitario de Sucre footballers
Bolivian football managers
Bolivian Primera División managers
Bolivian expatriate football managers
Bolivian expatriate sportspeople in Ecuador
Expatriate football managers in Ecuador
Footballers from Santa Fe, Argentina
Independiente Petrolero managers
Fuerza Amarilla S.C. managers
C.S.D. Macará managers